Adverse inference is a legal inference, adverse to the concerned party, drawn from silence or absence of requested evidence. It is part of evidence codes based on common law in various countries.

According to Lawvibe, "the 'adverse inference' can be quite damning at trial. Essentially, when plaintiffs try to present evidence on a point essential to their case and can't because the document has been destroyed (by the defendant), the jury can infer that the evidence would have been adverse to (the defendant), and adopt the plaintiff’s reasonable interpretation of what the document would have said...."

In the United States 

The United States Court of Appeals for the Eighth Circuit pointed out in 2004, in a case involving spoliation (destruction) of evidence, that "the giving of an adverse inference instruction often terminates the litigation in that it is 'too difficult a hurdle' for the spoliating party to overcome. The court therefore concluded that the adverse inference instruction is an 'extreme' sanction that should 'not be given lightly'...." However, Adverse Inference does not apply in criminal actions where an individual asserts the Fifth Amendment right against self incrimination, but may be used in civil actions only. 

This rule applies not only to evidence destroyed but also to evidence existing but not produced by the party as well as to evidence under a party's control but not produced. See Notice to produce. The adverse inference is based upon the presumption that the party who controls the evidence would have produced it, if it had been supportive. 

Adverse inference can also apply to a witness known to exist but the party refuses to identify or produce, where it is also known as the Missing-Witness Rule, or the Empty-Chair Doctrine.

In English law 

After a change in the law in 1994, the right to silence under English law was amended because the court and jury were allowed to draw adverse inference from such a silence. Under English law, the police, cautioning someone, say, "You do not have to say anything. But it may harm your defence if you do not mention, when questioned, something which you later rely on in court". Under English law, the court and the jury may draw an adverse inference from fact that someone did not mention a defence when given the chance to do so if charged with an offence.

References 

Legal terminology
Inference
Legal reasoning